Rose Avenue may refer to:

Music
Rose Avenue, a Finnish band featuring Jann Wilde
Rose Ave., a 2014 album by You+Me

Streets and locations
Rose Avenue, a street in the neighborhood of Templestowe Lower, Victoria, Australia
 La Rose Avenue, a street in Etobicoke, Toronto, Ontario, Canada; see Humber Heights-Westmount
Rose Avenue, a residence hall at UCLA, Los Angeles, California
Rose Avenue, a street in Los Angeles, California, that starts in the Castle Heights neighborhood and ends in Venice
Rose Avenue, a street in Staten Island, New York and location of New Dorp station
Rose Avenue, a street in the community of Eagledale, Bainbridge Island, Washington, US

See also
 127 Rose Avenue, a 2099 album by Hank Williams, Jr.
 Rose (disambiguation)
 Rose Street
 Mount Rose Avenue (York)
 Mt. Rose Highway